Chen Hongqiu (born 11 August 1992) is a Chinese male hammer thrower, who won an individual gold medal at the Youth World Championships.

References

External links

1992 births
Living people
Chinese male hammer throwers
Sportspeople from Hainan
21st-century Chinese people